Laibach is a Slovenian avant-garde music group associated with the industrial, martial, and neo-classical genres. Formed in the mining town of Trbovlje (at the time in Yugoslavia) in 1980, Laibach represents the musical wing of the Neue Slowenische Kunst (NSK) collective, a group which Laibach helped found in 1984. "Laibach" is the German historical name for the Slovenian capital Ljubljana, itself an oblique reference to the Nazi occupation of Slovenia in World War II.

From the early days, the band was subject to controversies and bans due to their elaborate use of iconography with ambiguously repugnant parodies and pastiches of elements from totalitarianism, nationalism and militarism, a concept they have preserved throughout their career. Censored and banned in Socialist Yugoslavia and receiving a kind of dissident status, the band embarked on international tours and gradually acquired international fame. After Slovenia became independent in 1991, Laibach's status in the country has turned from rejection to promotion into a national cultural icon, which included performances with the Slovenian symphony orchestra.

Early Laibach albums were pure industrial, with heavy rhythms and roaring vocals. Later in the mid-80s, the sound became more richly layered, featuring samples from pop and classical music. The band's lyrics, variously written in German, Slovene and English, are usually delivered by the baritone voice of the singer Milan Fras. Initially the lyrics handled war and military themes; later, the focus turned to any highly charged political issue of the moment, sending intentionally ambiguous messages. They recorded several cover versions of popular songs, often turning light melodies into sinister-sounding Gothic tunes.

The band has seen numerous line-up changes, with Dejan Knez, Milan Fras, Ervin Markošek and Ivan "Jani" Novak forming the best-known line-up. They have worked with a number of collaborators and guest musicians. Laibach has also recorded film soundtracks, theatre music and produced works of visual arts, while the band members have embarked on a number of side projects.

History

Laibach with Tomaž Hostnik (1980–1982)
Laibach was formed on 1 June 1980 in Trbovlje, a mining-industry town. Laibach is the German language name of the city of Ljubljana, a name used during the period when Slovenia was a part of the Habsburg monarchy and the World War II occupation of Yugoslavia. At the time, the group collaborated with art groups Irwin (painting) and Rdeči Pilot (theatre). Since its formation, Laibach had been preparing a multimedia project "Rdeči revirji" ("Red District"), a piece intended to challenge and provoke the current political structures in Trbovlje. The group's use of Malevich's black crosses on their posters was determined to be "improper and irresponsible," leading to the cancellation of the performance of Red District, an action which was met with considerable negative reaction in the media and by the general public. At this early stage of their career, Laibach's visuals employed mining iconography. Eventually, the group would add such symbols as Triglav, deer horns and the Malevich's black cross encircled with a gear.

The first live appearance and an exhibition entitled "Žrtve letalske nesreče" ("Victims of an Air Accident") took place in January 1982 at the Ljubljana club FV, followed by performances in Belgrade and Zagreb. At the time, the group's musical style was characterized by critics as "industrial rock", and for their live performances they used gramophones, radio devices and electronic instruments constructed by themselves. Instead of the dry ice stage effect, the group used original military smoke bombs which was as unpleasant for themselves as for the audience. At the Novi Rock festival in Ljubljana during the same year, the frontman Tomaž Hostnik appeared in a military uniform and despite being hit by a bottle in the face, causing him serious injuries, he managed to bring the performance to an end. However, Hostnik committed ritual suicide in December 1982 by hanging himself from one of the most powerful Slovenian national symbols, a hayrack, near his hometown of Medvode. Laibach disapproved of his act of suicide and posthumously expelled Hostnik from the group, returning him to his private identity. Despite this, the group often referred to him and dedicated various projects to him, including an installation entitled Apologia Laibach, created around Hostnik's self-portrait.

Dissident status in Yugoslavia (1983–1985)

In April 1983 the group resumed its activities with a live appearance in Ljubljana, featuring guest performances by the English bands Last Few Days and 23 Skidoo, for which recordings of dogs barking and snarling were used as the concert intro. The day after the performance, the group received considerable media coverage for a concert at the Zagreb Biennale entitled "Mi kujemo bodočnost" ("We Forge the Future"), during which the group used simultaneous projections of a pornographic movie and the film Revolucija še traja (The Revolution is Still Going On). The performance was eventually interrupted by the police, forcing the group to leave the stage after the appearance of a penis and Josip Broz Tito at the same time on the screens. The subsequent debut television appearance on 23 June 1983, in the informative-political program TV Tednik, caused major negative reactions after which they were banned from using the name Laibach as well as performing in public.

The group then started an international The Occupied Europe Tour '83, with the group Last Few Days, which included sixteen dates in eight Eastern and Western European countries. The performances provoked a lot of interest in the European media, especially with the totalitarian musical and visual style. The socialist realism background, effective live appearances and a dissident status in their home country provided the group with a swift increase of interest of the Western countries. Their provocative usage of symbols from Nazi Germany firstly provoked the Slovene WW2 Veteran Organization in Yugoslavia. By combining the imagery of socialist realism, Nazism and Italian futurism, the group created a unique aesthetic style which could not pass unnoticed by the public. The song lyrics were initially written in German, but having included cover versions of English-language songs, the group focused more on the latter.

In 1984, the group moved to London and started working as labourers, acted as soldiers in Stanley Kubrick's Full Metal Jacket and worked at a pier in Belfast. Due to the fact that they were banned from using the name Laibach, the group held a secret concert at the Ljubljana Malči Belič hall dedicated to the deceased Tomaž Hostnik. During that period, the group, with their early collaborators Irwin and Rdeči Pilot founded the informal art organization Neue Slowenische Kunst (German for New Slovene Art).

The following year, the group released their debut studio album, Laibach, through the Ljubljana ŠKUC Ropot label, which did not feature the group name on the album cover, due to its ban, and a sample from a speech by Tito on one of the album tracks was also censored. During the same year, the German label WUS released a compilation album Rekapitulacija 1980–1984 (Recapitulation 1980–1984). With the Gledališče Sester Scipion Nasice, the group performed in their own play Krst pod Triglavom (A Baptism Under Triglav) at the Ljubljana Cankarjev dom. During 1985, the group also released its second album Nova Akropola (The New Acropolis) via British independent record label Cherry Red. After the album release, the group performed its first legal concert in Hum (Slovenia), entitled "Krvava gruda, plodna zemlja" ("Bloody Land, Fertile Soil"). They had asked the 12th congress of the SSO of Slovenia to be allowed to use the name Laibach and have public performances, a request which had been accepted. The group subsequently got the "Zlata ptica" ("The Golden Bird") award at the Yugoslav Youth Day.

International breakthrough (1986–1991)
In London, The group recorded three songs for John Peel session, performed for the Michael Clark dance company's No Fire Escape from Hell. Having signed for Mute Records, started recording their third studio album, Opus Dei, with Slavko Avsenik Jr. The inner sleeve of the cover featured a swastika consisting of four bloodied axes designed by John Heartfield, an anti-Nazi artist. The record was sold secretly in some European countries, as the meaning of the cover was not recognised. The usage of Nazi symbols and the name "Opus Dei" caused the Catholic institution of the same name to sue the group but the case was eventually decided in favour of Laibach. Following the album release, the group embarked on a European tour, during which they stated at a press conference in France that their influences are Tito, Toto, and Tati.

In Hamburg, the group performed and wrote the music for an adaptation of William Shakespeare's Macbeth at the Deutsches Schauspielhaus, which was eventually released in 1989 as Macbeth. In 1988, the group released the album Let It Be, featuring cover versions of all the songs from the Beatles album of the same name, with the exception of the title track, which they did not record owing to lack of studio time, and "Maggie Mae", which was replaced by the German anthems "Auf der Lüneburger Heide" and "Was Gleicht Wohl Auf Erden". A part of the recorded material from the album was broadcast by Paul McCartney before his concerts.

In 1989, their performance in Zagreb started with the Serbian instrument the gusle and in Belgrade, the NSK philosopher Peter Mlakar held a speech as a cynical parody of Slobodan Milošević's speeches in SAP Kosovo. The following year, the group released the EP Sympathy for the Devil, an album of different cover versions of the Rolling Stones song of the same name. The group also achieved a commercial success with the cover versions of "Live Is Life" by Opus and "One Vision" by Queen. During the same year, on 21 December the group celebrated their 10th anniversary with a first ever live performance at the thermoelectric power station in Trbovlje. 16 years later Chris Bohn of the Wire magazine proclaimed this show as one of the 60 most powerful concerts of all times. After this concert, the group undertook a tour of Bosnia and Herzegovina.

Commercial success and after (1992–present)
During 1991, Slovenia became an independent state.
In 1992, the group released Kapital an album featuring their own vision of materialism. The following year, Mute Records released the Ljubljana–Zagreb–Beograd live album, recorded at performances in the three cities in 1982, presenting a document of politically active rock from the group's early career, especially in the songs "Tito-Tito", "Država" ("The State"), and "Rdeči molk" ("Red Silence"). In 1994, they released the album NATO, which commented on the current political events in Eastern Europe, former Yugoslavia and the actions of the NATO pact, filtered through their vision of techno and pop. The album featured cover versions of Europe's "The Final Countdown", Bolland & Bolland's "In the Army Now", Don Fardon's "Indian Reservation" (renamed to "National Reservation"), and the Stanislav Binički composition "Marš na Drinu" ("March on the Drina").

Following the album release, the group went on the Occupied Europe NATO Tour 1994-95, resulting in the live and video album of the same name, which featured a selection of recordings from the two-year tour, including the performance in Sarajevo on the date of the signing of the Dayton Agreement. In 1995, the group for a while considered splitting into several simultaneous lineups so that they could perform in different places at the same time, but the idea was abandoned. The following year, the group released Jesus Christ Superstars, a reference to the Andrew Lloyd Webber's rock opera Jesus Christ Superstar. The group promoted the album in the US with an eighteen-date tour, as well as a German tour.

On 15 May 1997, the group performed with the Slovenian symphony orchestra, conducted by Marko Letonja, and the "Tone Tomšič" choir, for the opening ceremony of the Ljubljana European Month of Culture, presenting orchestral versions of their earliest material, which they rarely performed live, arranged by Uroš Rojko and Aldo Kumar with the members of the group. During the same year, the live album M.B. 21 December 1984 was released, featuring recordings of the forbidden concert in the Ljubljana Malči Belič Hall, a February 1985 concert at the Berlin Atonal festival, and the April 1985 performance at the Zagreb club Kulušić. The performances had featured a guest appearance by Jože Pegam on clarinet and trumpet, and recordings of Tito's speeches. On 14 November 1997 at a concert in Belgrade, another Peter Mlakar speech received a decidedly mixed audience reaction (in sharp contrast to the 1989 speech), in which he asked the audience to "eat the pig and digest it once and for all", referring to the then president Slobodan Milošević.

In 2003, the group released the album WAT (an acronym for We Are Time), which, as well as new material, featured the song "Tanz mit Laibach" (German for "Dance with Laibach"), inspired by the German band D.A.F. The song lyrics were co-written with Peter Mlakar, and the music was co-written with the producer Iztok Turk (former member of Videosex) and the DJs Umek, Bizzy and Dojaja. The following year, the group released a double compilation album Anthems, featuring a career spanning selection of material as well as the previously unreleased song "Mama Leone", a Drafi Deutscher cover, and remixes by Random Logic, Umek, Octex, Iztok Turk and others. The compilation also features a thorough group biography written by Alexei Monroe. The group also released two DVD's: the first, Laibach, featured music videos, including a new music video for the song "Das Spiel ist aus", and A Film about WAT directed by Sašo Podgoršek. The second DVD was 2 with a recording from the Occupied Europe NATO Tour concert in Ljubljana on 26 October 1995 and A Film from Slovenia, directed by Daniel Landin and Peter Vezjak.

In 2004, the group recorded The Divided States of America – Laibach 2004 Tour, released on DVD in 2006 and directed by Sašo Podgoršek during the group's fourth USA tour. During 2006, the group released the album Volk (Slovenian for Wolf, German for People), featuring cover versions of national anthems, including the NSK state anthem "Das Lied der Deutschen", originally written in 1797 and used during the Weimar Republic. Each cover featured a guest vocalist singing the anthem in their own language. During the same year, on 1 June, the group performed J. S. Bach's "The Art of Fugue" in his hometown Leipzig, and their interpretation of the work was released on the album Laibachkunstderfuge in 2008.

On 15 October 2013 Laibach announced new album Spectre to be released in 2014, and they released the EP record S featuring three songs from the album and one from a 2012 live album. The songs from the new album are also downloadable for limited time for subscribers of their mailing list. The album's first single "Resistance is Futile" was published on 8 January 2014.

In July 2014, Laibach released an EP to coincide with the 70th anniversary of the outbreak of the Warsaw Uprising. The project was commissioned by Poland's National Cultural Centre and includes a reworking of one of the classic songs of the insurgency; "Warszawskie Dzieci" ("Children of Warsaw").

In April 2015, Laibach launched an Indiegogo fundraising campaign to augment costs of a tour in the United States which started in May 2015.

On 11 June 2015, Laibach announced that they would be performing a show in Pyongyang, North Korea in August 2015. The band later confirmed through their website and the website of their record label, Mute Records, that they would perform two concerts on 19 and 20 August 2015 at Kim Won Gyun Musical Conservatory in Nampo-dong, Pyongyang, to coincide with the 70th anniversary of the end of Japanese colonial rule in Korea. The concert is the subject of the documentary film Liberation Day by Morten Traavik and Uģis Olte, which premiered in 2016. Contrary to what press releases suggest, Laibach was not the first western rock band to perform in North Korea.

On 8 June 2017, Laibach announced new album Also Sprach Zarathustra to be released on 14 July 2017 along with the lead single "Das Nachtlied I" and an accompanying tour. The songs on the album were originally composed for a theatrical production of Thus Spoke Zarathustra, based on Friedrich Nietzsche's novel of the same name.

On 12 June 2018, Laibach marked the historic summit in Singapore between President Donald Trump and the leader of North Korea, Kim Jong-un, by sharing a track Arirang dedicated to the Korean reunification process.

Laibach was scheduled to perform in Kyiv on March 31, 2023. However, the band's description of the war in Ukraine as a proxy war angered many Ukrainians and the concert was canceled.

Musical style

Laibach's cover versions are often used to subvert the original message or intention of the song—a notable example being their version of the song "Live Is Life" by Opus, an Austrian arena rock band. Laibach recorded two new interpretations of the song, titled "Leben heißt Leben" and "Opus Dei". The first, the opening song on the Laibach album Opus Dei (1987), was sung in German. The second was promoted as a single, and its promotional video (which used the title "Life Is Life") was played extensively on American cable channel MTV. "Opus Dei" retained some of the original song's English lyrics, but was delivered in a musical style that left the meaning of the lyrics open to interpretation. Whereas the original is a feel-good pop anthem, Laibach's interpretation twists the melody into a triumphant military march. With the exception of the promotional video, the refrain is at one point translated into German, giving an example of the sensitivity of lyrics to their context. The Opus Dei album also features a cover of Queen's "One Vision" with lyrics translated into German under the title '"Geburt einer Nation" ("Birth of a Nation"), revealing the ambiguity of lines like "One race one hope/One real decision". In NATO (1994), Laibach also memorably re-worked Europe's glam metal anthem "The Final Countdown" as a bombastic disco epic.

Other notable covers include Let It Be (1988), reinterpretation of the eponymous Beatles album. The ensuing maxi-single Sympathy for the Devil (1988) deconstructs the Rolling Stones song of the same name with seven different interpretations.

Laibach not only references modern artists through reinterpretation, but also samples or reinvents older musical pieces. For example, their song "Anglia" is based on the national anthem of the United Kingdom, God Save the Queen, released on Volk, a collection of Laibach's versions of several national anthems. On this album they also included an anthem for their NSK State in Time, based on their song The Great Seal from Opus Dei.

They have also toured with an audio-visual performance centered on Johann Sebastian Bach's Die Kunst der Fuge. Since this work has no specifications of acquired instruments and is furthermore based on mathematical principles, Laibach has argued that the music can be seen as proto-techno. Therefore, the band found Die Kunst der Fuge to be ideal for an interpretation using computers and software.

In 2009 Laibach reworked Richard Wagner's Overture to Tannhäuser, Siegfried-Idyll and The Ride Of The Valkyries in collaboration with the symphonic orchestra RTV Slovenia, conducted by Izidor Leitinger. Laibach's version is titled "VolksWagner".

In addition to cover songs, Laibach has remixed songs by other bands. These include two songs by the Florida death metal band Morbid Angel that appear on the Morbid Angel EP Laibach Re-mixes.

In 2009 Laibach made new versions of their own songs from the early 1980s such as Brat moj, Boji and Smrt za smrt.

Aesthetics, image, and controversy

Although primarily a musical group, Laibach has sometimes worked in other media. In their early years, especially before the founding of Neue Slowenische Kunst (NSK), Laibach produced several works of visual art. A notable example was MB 84 Memorandum (1984) an image of a black cross that served as a way to advertise Laibach's appearances during a period in the 1980s when the government of Yugoslavia banned the name "Laibach". Cross imagery, and variations on the cross are apparent in many Laibach recordings and publications.

The visual imagery of Laibach's art (or 'Laibach Kunst', as it calls itself) has been described as "radically ambiguous". An early example of this ambiguity would be the woodcut entitled The Thrower, also known as Metalec (The Metal Worker). This work features a monochrome silhouette of a figure with a clenched fist holding a hammer aloft. The work could be seen as promoting industrial protest or as a symbol of industrial pride. Another aspect of this woodcut is the large typefaced word 'LAIBACH', evoking memories of the Nazi occupation of Slovenia (when the capital city was briefly known by its German language name of Laibach). This piece was featured prominently during a TV interview of Laibach in 1983, during which the interviewer Jure Pengov called Laibach "enemies of the people."

Laibach has frequently been accused of both far left and far right political stances due to their use of uniforms and totalitarian-style aesthetics. They were also accused of being members of the neo-nationalism movement, which reincarnates modern ideas of nationalism. When confronted with such accusations, Laibach is quoted as replying with the ambiguous response "We are fascists as much as Hitler was a painter". In addition, Laibach also provided most of the soundtrack for Iron Sky, a film that mocked Nazism.

The members of Laibach are notorious for rarely stepping out of character. Some releases feature artwork by the communist and early Dada artist and satirist John Heartfield. Laibach concerts have sometimes aesthetically appeared as political rallies. When interviewed, they often answer in wry manifestos, showing a paradoxical lust for, and condemnation of, authority.

Finnish author and nationalist Tuomas Tähti disclosed in his 2019 book Nationalistin henkinen horisontti that Laibach member Ivan "Jani" Novak told him in March 2015 that the band is a communist group and most of their work is connected to communism.

Richard Wolfson wrote of the group:

Legacy, influence, and innovation

Martial music
Some early material by Laibach and later neoclassical releases by the band, such as 1990's Macbeth release, were influential on certain artists within the martial industrial music genre.

Rammstein
Laibach is often cited as an influence for the popular German Neue Deutsche Härte band Rammstein. The parallel is regularly made between the bands regarding their aesthetics and deep male vocals both groups share and with their respective backgrounds of originating from former socialist countries. When asked about the topic in an interview, the guitar player of Rammstein, Richard Kruspe, claimed Rammstein to have a more emotional approach instead of the more "intellectual" style of Laibach. In the same interview the keyboard player of Rammstein Christian Lorenz drew a parallel between the deep voices of Till Lindemann and Milan Fras but considered this to be the only similarity between the two music groups. The film "Liberation day" ends with a notice stating that a member of a certain industrial metal band was supposed to be interviewed for the film about the influence Laibach had on their earlier work, but it had to be removed due to the prospect of arrest or a fine from the district court of Berlin towards the makers of the film. This, and the early promotional material for the film suggest that it was Paul Landers who was to appear in the film, thus to some extent confirming the connection between these two music groups. 
When members of Laibach were asked by an interviewer about Rammstein "stealing" from them, they responded: "Laibach does not believe in originality... Therefore, Rammstein could not 'steal' much from us. They simply let themselves get inspired by our work, which is absolutely a legitimate process. We are glad that they made it. In a way, they have proven once again that a good 'copy' can make more money on the market than the 'original'. Anyhow, today we share the territory: Rammstein seem to be a kind of Laibach for adolescents and Laibach are Rammstein for grown-ups." Laibach would later provide a remix for the Rammstein single "Ohne dich".

Documentaries
Laibach has been the subject of several documentaries:
 2016, Liberation Day – directed by Ugis Olte and Morten Traavik
 2005, Divided States of America: Laibach 2004 Tour – directed by Sašo Podgoršek
 1996, Predictions of Fire (Prerokbe ognja) – directed by Michael Benson
 1993, Laibach: A Film from Slovenia – directed by Daniel Landin and Chris Bohn; also known under name Bravo
 1988, Laibach: Victory Under the Sun (Slovenian title: Laibach: Zmaga pod soncem; Serbian title Laibach: Pobeda pod suncem; Croatian title Laibach: Pobjeda pod suncem) – directed by Goran Gajić

Members

In 1978, Dejan Knez formed his first band Salte Morale, which was essentially the first incarnation of Laibach. During the summer of 1980, following the suggestion of Knez's father, the well-known Slovenian painter and artist Janez Knez, the band renamed itself Laibach. This incarnation included Dejan Knez, Srečko Bajda, Andrej Lupinc, Tomaž Hostnik and Marko Košnik. Soon after that, Knez's relative Ivan "Jani" Novak and Milan Fras joined the band. First a quintet, Laibach quickly became a quartet and declared that the group had four members – "Vier Personen".

From mid-1980s to mid-1990s, while the core quartet included Dejan Knez, Milan Fras, Ervin Markošek and Ivan "Jani" Novak, the members frequently used the pseudonyms Dachauer, Keller, Saliger and Eber. The pseudonym Ivo Saliger was originally used by original singer Tomaž Hostnik (since deceased) and more recently by Ivan Novak. Former member Andrej Lupinc has continued to use the pseudonym Keller after leaving the band. The pseudonym Elk Eber has been used by Dejan Knez. Occasionally, other musicians supplemented the core group, some of whom include Oto Rimele (from Lačni Franz), Nikola Sekulović (bass player from the Demolition Group), Matej Mršnik, and tour drummer Roman Dečman. Slovene singer and radio announcer Anja Rupel has also performed with the group.

On 20 June 2015, the band performed a sound performance Musical Nocturne with their most famous line-up of Knez, Novak, Fras and Markošek.

Official members (pseudonyms)
 Eber [vocals] (after Elk Eber)
 Saliger (after Ivo Saliger)
 Dachauer (after Wilhelm Dachauer)
 Keller

Current touring band (2018)
 Milan Fras – vocals
 Ivan "Jani" Novak – bandleader, main songwriter, lights
 Marina Mårtensson - vocals, acoustic guitar
 Bojan Krhlanko – drums
 Luka Jamnik – synthesizer
 Rok Lopatič – synthesizer
 Vitja Balžalorsky – guitar

Former members and collaborators

 Tomaž Hostnik – singer
 Dejan Knez – (founder and forming member) keyboards, electronics, drums (left the band in 2006)
 Marko Košnik – electronics
 Srečko Bajda (founder and forming member) electronics
 Andrej Lupinc (founder and forming member) electronics
 Ervin Markošek – drums, keyboards, electronics (left the band in 1989, returned for the next album Kapital, and appears on press photos until WAT)
 Mina Špiler – vocals, synthesizer
 Vasja Ulrih - voice on some early tracks (Država) and some tracks on NATO and Kapital albums
 Janko Novak, voice on some tracks on Let It Be album
 Bine Zerko (founder and forming member)
 Roman Dečman – tour drummer from 1986 to 2006
 Nikola Sekulović – bass
 Matej Mršnik – guitars
 Dragoslav Draža Radojković – drums
 Dare Hocevar – bass
 Borut Kržišnik – guitar
 Oto Rimele – guitar

 Eva Breznikar – (member of Slovenian group Make Up 2) vocals, percussion
 Nataša Regovec – (former member of Slovenian pop group Make Up 2) vocals, percussion
 Sašo Vollmaier – synthesizer
 Boris Benko (member of the group Silence) vocals
 Primož Hladnik (member of the group Silence)
 Damjan Bizilj – synthesizer
 Iztok Turk – electronics, composer
 Anja Rupel – vocals
 Jože Pegam – various instruments
 Matjaž Pegam
 Peter Mlakar - philosopher, speeches
 Sašo Podgoršek – videos
 Svetozar Mišić – documentation
 Anže Rozman - live orchestral arrangements
 Álvaro Domínguez Vázquez - live orchestral arrangements
 Slavko Avsenik Jr. – orchestral and choir arrangements (from Opus Dei to Spectre)

Appearances in popular culture
 In 1989, on his second studio album Hoćemo gusle (We Want Gusle), Rambo Amadeus recorded a Laibach parody song "Samit u burekdžinici Laibach" ("Summit in the burek-bakery Laibach"), featuring the song lyrics from the poems "Santa Maria della Salute" ("Saint Mary of Health") by Laza Kostić and "Ne, nemoj mi prići" ("No, Do Not Come Near Me") by Desanka Maksimović and the chorus from the turbo folk singer Šaban Šaulić song "Čaše lomim, ruke mi krvave" ("I Break the Glasses, My Hands Are Bleeding"). A promotional video was also recorded for the track.
 Von Bach, a fictional superpowered character modeled after Milan Fras, appears in the DC Comics graphic novel Kingdom Come, by Alex Ross and Mark Waid. In it, he appears dressed in Laibach-style uniform and displays the group's cross tattooed on his chest. He is described as follows: "German-speaking superhuman and would-be dictator is the example of the Hitleresque villain that had so much symbolic importance in the Golden Age of comic books. The blocky cross on his chest is evocative of the kind of bold symbols used by fascists. Von Bach has the words 'Liebe' (love) and 'Hass' (hate) tattooed on his arms and, in fact, his entire body has been covered with one large tattoo of that dark color that most tattoos become, with his natural flesh color only coming through in the designs on his body". On the NSK State website, the band states they have "been paid with uncommon honour" by this.
 In 1999, a tribute album to Laibach titled Schlecht und Ironisch – Laibach Tribut was released.
 Laibach's version of the Juno Reactor song "God Is God" (which was inspired by Laibach's "Opus Dei") from album Jesus Christ Superstars appears on the second soundtrack disc for the computer game Command & Conquer: Red Alert, which was released only in the German release of the Special Edition pack, and on the album "The Blair Witch Project: Josh's Blair Witch Mix".
 Canadian industrial doom metal band Zaraza released a tribute EP called Montrealska Akropola – A Tribute to Laibach in 2004.
 The crowd-funded film Iron Sky makes use of the song "B Mashina" in one of its trailers. The official soundtrack to the film was written by Laibach and released as an album. Continuing with the theme Iron Sky: The Coming Race will also have its music done by Laibach, and has used their song "Koran" in two of its trailers.
 In July 2015, the TV show Last Week Tonight with John Oliver talks about Laibach's plan to play at National Liberation Day in North Korea.

Discography

Studio albums
 Laibach (1985)
 Nova Akropola (1986)
 Opus Dei (1987)
 Let It Be (1988) 
 Sympathy for the Devil (1989)
 Kapital (1992)
 NATO (1994)
 Jesus Christ Superstars (1996)
 WAT (2003)
 Volk (2006)
 Laibachkunstderfuge (2008)
 Spectre (2014)
 The Sound of Music (2018)
 Party Songs (EP) (2019)
 Laibach Revisited (2020)
 Wir sind das Volk (2022)
 Sketches of the Red Districts (2023)
 Love Is Still Alive (EP) (2023)

Soundtracks
 Krst pod Triglavom – Baptism/Klangniederschrift einer Taufe (1986)
 Macbeth (1990)
 Iron Sky – The Original Soundtrack (2012)
 Also Sprach Zarathustra (2017)

Compilation albums
 Rekapitulacija 1980–1984 (1985)
 Slovenska Akropola (1987)
 Anthems (2004)
 Gesamtkunstwerk – Dokument 81–86 (2011)
 An Introduction to... Laibach (2012)

Live albums
 Neu Konservatiw (1985, re-release on CD, 2003)
 The Occupied Europe Tour 83-85 (1990)
 Ljubljana-Zagreb-Beograd (1993)
 M.B. 21 December 1984 (1997)
 The John Peel Sessions (2002)
 Volk Tour London CC Club 16 April 2007 (2007)
 Monumental Retro-Avant-Garde – Live at London Tate Modern 14 April 2012 (2012)
 We forge the future (2021)

Singles
7-inch singles
 "Life Is Life" / "Germania" (Mute, 1987, London)
 "Across the Universe" / "Maggie Mae" (Mute, 1988, London)

12-inch singles
 "Boji" / "Sila" / "Brat Moj" (L.A.Y.L.A.H. (in association with Les Disques Du Crepuscule), 1984, Bruxelles)
 "Panorama" / "Decree" (East-West Trading Comp. (Cherry Red), 1984, London)
 "Die Liebe" / "Grösste Kraft" (Cherry Red, 1985)
 "Geburt einer Nation" / "Leben heisst Leben (ins.)" (Mute, 1987, London)
 "Life Is Life" / "Germania" / "Life" (Mute, 1987, London)
 "Sympathy for the Devil 1" / "Laibach, 300.000 V.K." (Mute, 1988, London)
 "Sympathy for the Devil 2" / "Germania, 300.000 V.K." (Mute, 1988, London)
 "Sympathy for the Devil" / "Sympathy for the Devil" (picture disc with two versions) (Mute, 1988, London)
 "Across the Universe" / "Maggie Mae" / "Get Back" (Mute, 1988, London)
 "3. Oktober" / "Geburt einer Nation (live)" ((German-only 12" single) Mute / Intercord Gmbh, 1990, London / Stuttgart)
 "Wirtschaft ist tot" / "Wirtschaft ist tot" (Mute, 1992, London)
 "Wirtschaft ist tot" / "Sympathy for the Devil" ((remixes, for promotion only) Mute, 1992, London)
 "Final Countdown" / "Final Countdown" (Mute, 1994, London)
 "In the Army Now" / "War" (Mute, 1995, London)
 "God Is God" (Mute, 7 October 1996, London)
 "Tanz mit Laibach" (Mute, 2004, London)
 "Das Spiel ist aus" (Mute, 2004, London)
 "Anglia" (Mute, 2006, London)

CD singles
 "Sympathy for the Devil" / "Sympathy for the Devil" / "Sympathy for the Devil" ((picture CD with three versions) Mute, 1988, London)
 "Across the Universe" / "Maggie Mae" / "Get Back" (Mute, 1988, London)
 "Panorama" / "Die Liebe" / "Decree" / "Grösste Kraft" (Cherry Red, 1989, London)
 "3. Oktober" / "Geburt einer Nation (live)" ((German-only cd) Mute / Intercord Gmbh, 1990, London / Stuttgart)
 "Wirtschaft ist tot" / "Wirtschaft ist tot" (Mute, 1992, London)
 "Final Countdown" / "Final Countdown" (Mute, 1994, London)
 "In the Army Now" / "War" (Mute, 1995, London)
 "Jesus Christ Superstar" / "God Is God" (Mute, 7 October 1996, London)
 "Tanz mit Laibach" (Mute, 2004, London)
 "Das Spiel ist aus" (Mute, 2004, London)
 "Anglia" (Mute, 2006, London)
 "1 VIII 1944" (Narodowe Centrum Kultury, 2014, Warsaw)

Cassettes
 "Laibach/Last Few Days" (Skuc, 1983, Ljubljana)
 "Documents of Oppression (live from N.L. Centrum, Amsterdam)" (Staal Tape, 1984, Amsterdam)
 "Vstajenje v Berlinu (live in Berlin 1984)" (Skuc, 1984, Ljubljana)
 "Live in Hell (live from Hell's-Hertogenbosch, 1985)" (V2, 1985, Bois-le-Duc)
 "Ein Schauspieler (live from the N.L. Centrum Amsterdam Church, 1985)" (Staal Tape, 1985, Amsterdam)
 "Divergences/Divisions (live in Bordeaux, 1986)" (Le Réseau, 1986, Bordeaux/Toulouse)

Side projects
 300.000 V.K., Dejan Knez avant-garde electronic music side project
 Germania, side project, Laibach, Iztok Turk, and Anja Rupel
 Kraftbach
 600.000 V.K., responsible for the music for the Noordung theatre productions
 Sturm und Klang
 Baron Carl von Reichenbach, Dejan Knez avant-garde electronic music side project
 Neue Slowenische Kunst – Slovenian arts collective
 Europe Today'', theatre show with East West Theatre Company and Slovene National Theatre, Maribor

References

Additional sources

 
 
 
 
 . Foreword by Slavoj Žižek.

External links

 
 Laibach at Discogs
 Laibach at AllMusic
 Laibach at Rateyourmusic
 How Laibach and Muslimgauze Made the Last Communist Leader a Music Icon
 Laibach explained at YouTube

Industrial metal musical groups
Industrial rock musical groups
Musical groups established in 1980
Musical quintets
Mute Records artists
Slovenian industrial music groups
Slovenian dark wave musical groups
Slovenian post-punk music groups
Slovenian rock music groups
Trbovlje
Wax Trax! Records artists
Yugoslav musical groups
Yugoslav rock music groups